RVR may refer to:

Rapid Ventricular Rate, a type of fast heartbeat; see List of medical abbreviations: R
Rift Valley Railways, railways systems management consortium in Kenya and Uganda
River Valley Ranch, a Christian resort and youth camp located in Carroll County, Maryland, USA, see Arlington Baptist High School
Royal Victoria Regiment, an infantry regiment of the Australian Army
Runway visual range, an aeronautical term denoting the range over which a pilot can see the runway surface markings or lights
RVR, the Amtrak service code for Richmond Staples Mill Road (Amtrak station)
Mitsubishi RVR, a compact MPV built by Mitsubishi Motors
Rīgas Vagonbūves Rūpnīca, a Riga-based machine-building factory
Realm versus Realm, a type of player versus player gameplay in massively multiplayer online role-playing games (MMORPG)
RVR Riga, a Latvian football club from Riga from the 1950s, see 1956 Latvian SSR Higher League
Rother Valley Railway, a heritage railway line in East Sussex, United Kingdom